Eynali Cable is a gondola lift in Mount Eynali at North of Tabriz, Iran. The lift is designed to be a three stage lift and the first phase is operational since Fall 2010. The first station is in the foothills of the Eynali and it goes up to Zoroasterian temple at the local peak of Eynali.

References

Gondola lifts in Iran
Tabriz
Tourist attractions in Tabriz
Transportation in East Azerbaijan Province
2010 establishments in Iran